Marco Abate (born 29 August 1962) is an Italian mathematician.

Life 

He was born in Milan, Italy on 29 August 1962.

Career 

He completed his PhD in 1988 at the Scuola Normale Superiore di Pisa. His dissertation thesis was titled Iteration Theory of Holomorphic Maps on Taut Manifolds. His doctoral advisor was Edoardo Vesentini.

He is currently a professor of mathematics at the University of Pisa.

In 1989, he received the Bartolozzi Prize from the Italian Mathematical Union.

Bibliography 

Some of his books and papers are:

 Carleson measures and uniformly discrete sequences in strongly pseudoconvex domains
 Finsler Metrics – A Global Approach
  DESIGN AND VERIFICATION OF A DYNAMIC EXPERIMENTAL CAMPAIGN ON ANCHORING SYSTEMS THROUGH MACRO AND MICRO NUMERICAL MODELS

References

External links
 

1962 births
Living people
21st-century Italian mathematicians